Beringin Stadium is a football stadium in the town of Tembilahan, Indragiri Hilir Regency, Indonesia. The stadium has a capacity of 10,000 people. It is the home base of Persih Tembilahan.

References

Sports venues in Indonesia
Football venues in Indonesia